Montgomery City may refer to:
 Montgomery City, California
 Montgomery City, Missouri
 Montgomery, Alabama